A Strada Regionale (Italian for regional road), abbreviated SR, is a type of Italian road. Regional roads are generally maintained by the regions they traverse.

A regional road is less important than a state highway, but more important than a provincial road.

See also
Transport in Italy
State highway (Italy)
Provincial road
Municipal road

Roads in Italy